B8, B VIII or B-8 may refer to:

Transport

Roads
 B8 (Croatia), an expressway part of the Istrian Y highway network
 B8 road (Cyprus)
 B8 road (Kenya)
 B8 road (Namibia)
 Bundesstraße 8, a road in Germany

Other uses in transport
 B8 (New York City bus) serving Brooklyn
 Bavarian B VIII, a German steam locomotive model
 Bensen B-8, a 1955 United States small single-seat autogyro
 , a B-class submarine of the Royal Navy
 Mazda B8, a piston engine
 Fokker XB-8, a bomber prototype built for the United States Army Air Corps
 B8, the IATA code for Eritrean Airlines
 LNER Class B8, a class of British steam locomotives

Biology
 Proanthocyanidin B8, a B type proanthocyanidin
 Vitamin B8, a name sometimes used for inositol
 HLA-B8, an HLA-B serotype

Other
 B8 (bronze), an alloy used in cymbals
 b8 (spam filter), a statistical spam filter implemented in PHP
 Boron-8 (B-8 or 8B), an isotope of boron
 B8, a type of stereoautograph
 A subclass of B-class stars
 An international standard paper size (62×88 mm), defined in ISO 216
 The musical note 7 keys above a standard Grand Piano
 The postcode for Saltley, England
 B8, the category for warehousing under the United Kingdom planning regulations
 B-VIII reactor, an unsuccessful experiment that was part of the German nuclear weapons program